Abdullah Hukum station is an integrated rapid transit station in Kuala Lumpur, Malaysia, served by both the LRT Kelana Jaya Line and the KTM Komuter Port Klang Line.

The station consists of the elevated LRT station was opened first on 1 September 1998, together with a ground level KTM Komuter station which was constructed later as part of the KL Eco City development and physically integrated with the LRT station. The KTM Komuter station began operations on 28 October 2018.

Station features

Location
The station is located between Jalan Bangsar and the KL Eco City development to the south of the central business district of Kuala Lumpur. The station is named after the former Kampung Haji Abdullah Hukum, a village which was located between Jalan Bangsar and the Klang River, which has now become the KL Eco City development.

Besides KL Eco City, another major landmark near the Abdullah Hukum Station is the Tenaga Nasional Berhad headquarters which is located across Jalan Bangsar from the station.

LRT station
The LRT station is an elevated station that was built as part of the Kelana Jaya Line which was then known as Putra LRT. It was one of the 10 stations which was opened on 1 September 1998 when Phase One between Kelana Jaya station and Pasar Seni station (excluding the KL Sentral station opened later), began operations. The station is of the standard Kelana Jaya Line elevated station design, with the two elevated floors - a concourse level and two side platforms above the concourse level - above the ground floor which is used as a kiss and ride and taxi drop-off area.

KTM Komuter station
The KTM Komuter station is the newer section of the Abdullah Hukum Station complex and was built as part of the KL Eco City development located adjacent to KTM Bhd's Port Klang branch line. The station, which began operations on 28 October 2018, lies between the KL Sentral and Angkasapuri stations. Construction of the station began in 2014 by KL Eco City's developer KL Eco City Sdn Bhd, a subsidiary of Malaysian developer S P Setia, on 0.6 hectares of land owned by Railway Assets Corporation Sdn Bhd, the owner of all assets operated by KTM.

A common concourse one level above ground level links both the KTM Komuter and LRT stations. The upper road level of KL Eco City can also be accessed via an exit at this common concourse level, where the drop-off lay-bys for the station are located. The station's two side platforms are located at ground level while the level above the concourse (second level from ground) provides the connection to KL Eco City and, in the future, Mid Valley Megamall.

Connectivity to Mid Valley City
Despite its relative close proximity, there was no proper connection from the Abdullah Hukum station to Mid Valley City which lies just 250 metres east for many years. Prior to the construction of KL Eco City and the KTM Komuter station, pedestrians from the LRT station had to walk northwards along Jalan Bangsar to a pedestrian bridge and cross the railway tracks to the Putra Ria Apartment complex, then along the apartment access road and another pedestrian bridge into Mid Valley City. Alternatively, it was easier for commuters to directly use the Mid Valley Komuter station on the Seremban Line to reach Mid Valley City.

With the KTM Komuter station built, a dedicated footbridge was constructed to link Mid Valley City and Level 2 of the station through KL Eco City. The section of the bridge between the station and KL Eco City was opened together with the opening of the KTM station. The section between KL Eco City and Mid Valley City over the Klang River subsequently opened on 14 November 2019.

Station layout

Entrances and Exits
Abdullah Hukum station has a total of three entrances/exits, with one at the LRT station and two for the KTM station, including an elevated entrance above the KTM station concourse level connecting to the link bridge to KL Eco City and Mid Valley City. There is a door connecting the concourse levels of both the LRT and KTM stations.

Name
In the 1980s, there was a small halt named Taman Ghazali Station at the present Abdullah Hukum station's site, mostly for freight services.

Bus services

Gallery

See also
 Subang Jaya

References

External links 

KL MRT / LRT Line Integrations

Kelana Jaya Line
Railway stations opened in 1998